Commercial fishing is a major industry in Alaska, and has been for hundreds of years. Alaska Natives have been harvesting salmon and many other types of fish for millennia. Russians came to Alaska to harvest its abundance of sealife, as well as Japanese and other Asian cultures.

Job safety

Alaska's commercial fishermen work in one of the world's harshest environments. They endure isolated fishing grounds, high winds, seasonal darkness, very cold water, icing, freezing cold temperatures, days upon days away from family, and short fishing seasons, where very long work days are the norm. Fatigue, physical stress, and financial pressures face most Alaska fishermen through their careers. The hazardous work conditions faced by fishermen have a strong impact on their safety. Out of 948 work-related deaths that took place in Alaska during 1990-2006, one-third (311) occurred to fishermen. This is equivalent to an estimated annual fatality rate of 128/100,000 workers/year. This fatality rate is 26 times that of the overall U.S. work-related fatality rate of approximately 5/100,000 workers/year for the same time period.

While the work-related fatality rate for commercial fishermen in Alaska is still very high, it does appear to be decreasing: since 1990, there has been a 51 percent decline in the annual fatality rate. The successes in commercial fishing are due in part to the U.S. Coast Guard implementing new safety requirements in the early 1990s. These safety requirements contributed to 96 percent of the commercial fishermen surviving vessel sinkings/capsizings in 2004, whereas in 1991, only 73 percent survived. While the number of occupational deaths in commercial fishermen in Alaska has been reduced, there is a continuing pattern of losing 20 to 40 vessels every year. There are still about 100 fishermen who must be rescued each year from cold Alaska waters. Successful rescue is still dependent on the expertly trained personnel of the U.S. Coast Guard Search and Rescue operations, and such efforts can be hindered by the harshness of seas and the weather. Furthermore, the people involved in Search and Rescue operations are themselves at considerable risk for injury or death during these rescue attempts.

Salmon seining in Alaska
Purse seine usage in the Alaska salmon fishing industry:

Equipment

Toward the bow is a cabin, where the skipper and crew live (typically three to six people). The aft third of the boat consists of a flat deck, with a low rail around it. Amidships are hatch covers, which cover the fish hold, a tank where the fish are placed when caught. The stern is a simple flat area that holds the purse seine when it is out of the water. There are several booms, with various types of pulleys, used for working with the seine, and a deck winch for the same purpose. Shortly after the end of World War II, the modern type trawler for use in Alaska was introduced which could be used for all the various fishing seasons with its own processing ability, including freezing, was introduced, tripling production. After crab seas these boats are used as floating factory ships.

There is also a skiff, a small boat used for towing. When not in use, the skiff is usually towed behind the fishing boat, though in rough weather a boom can be used to lift it up and set it on the deck. For long trips where rough weather is likely, the seine will be placed into the fish hold as well, to lower the center of gravity of the vessel and make it safer.

The purse seine itself is usually black in color, with colorful "corks" (floats of some sort) strung along the cork line, and lead weights strung along the lead line. The size and attributes of purse seines are regulated by the Alaska Department of Fish and Game, which oversees the industry. It is stacked on the stern of the fishing boat with the corkline coiled on the port side, and the lead line coiled on the starboard side, with the web taking up the middle. The seine, when piled on board, is about the size of a large pickup truck, and is very heavy as well.

A "set" is a single operation of the purse seine, intended to result in a catch of fish.

Personnel
Different members of the crew have 

skipper's job is to hire crew, manage all operation of the equipment, find the fish, direct the operation, run the booms, navigate the boat, find a market, sell the fish, and pay the crew.
Skiffman

The skiffman has responsibility for the skiff, keeping the fuel tank supplied, maintaining the engine, and driving it around as needed. The skiff is attached to one end of the net when the crew is setting the net.  The skiffman is responsible for placement of the net. After the set the skiff and main boat loop.  The skiffman hands his end of the net to one of the deck hands.  He then swings around the boat and under the net where the other deck hands tosses him a tow line.  The skiff man then becomes responsible for the placement of the boat.  It is important to keep the net and boat centered.  If the tides push the net around the bow then there is a chance of the floats sinking and fish escaping.  If there is another boat setting near the boat the skiff man needs to keep his boat and net away from that set. The skipper may signal the skiffman aboard if help is needed to either pull up the bag of fish or "brail" the fish into the fish hole.  Brailing is when a large basket is dipped into the pocket of the net and then hauled aboard.  This method of getting the fish on board is still used in some parts of Alaska, however, most boats now bring their fish on board by "taking bites".

The deck hands take care of all of the tasks that need to be done on board during a set, such as detaching the skiff at the start of a set, plunging to scare fish away from the boat where they could escape the net by going under the boat, and cleaning the deck of seaweed and bycatch while the net is deployed, keeping an eye on the net and surrounding seas for snags or whales, stacking the cork line and lead line as the net is being taken back aboard, removing the odd fish/debris that has become entangled in the net, assisting with brailing (scooping the fish aboard at the end of a set), repairing holes in the net, pitching the fish into the fish hold, and on most boats cooking the meals.

See also

 Alaskan king crab fishing
 Fishing industry in the United States

References

External links
 National Institute for Occupational Safety and Health - Commercial Fishing in Alaska
 Alaska Marine Safety Education Association (AMSEA)